Sphingomonas insulae  is a Gram-negative, rod-shaped and motile bacteria from the genus of Sphingomonas which has been isolated from soil in Dokdo in Korea.

References

Further reading 
 <

External links
Type strain of Sphingomonas insulae at BacDive -  the Bacterial Diversity Metadatabase	

insulae
Bacteria described in 2008